Asano Mitsuakira (September 11, 1617 – May 27, 1693) was a Japanese samurai of the early Edo period who served as daimyō of the Hiroshima Domain from 1632 to 1672. His childhood name was Ichimatsu and later become Iwamatsu.

Family
 Father: Asano Nagaakira
 Mother: Tokugawa Furihime (1580–1617), third daughter of the shōgun Tokugawa Ieyasu
 Wife: Maeda Manhime (1618–1700), daughter of Maeda Toshitsune, 2nd Daimyo of Kaga Domain and Tokugawa Tamahime (daughter of the 2nd shōgun Tokugawa Hidetada and Asai Oeyo)
 Children:
 Asano Tsunaakira by Manhime
 Asano Naganao (1644–1666) by Manhime
 Asano Nagateru (1652–1702) by Manhime
 Ichihime married Tozawa Masanobu of Shinjō Domain by Manhime
 Kamehime married Sengoku Tadatoshi of Ueda Domain by Manhime
 Hisahime married Ogasawara Tadakatsu of Kokura Domain by Manhime

References

Daimyo
Samurai
1617 births
1693 deaths
Asano clan